Cornwall was a federal electoral district represented in the House of Commons of Canada from 1867 to 1882. It was located in the province of Ontario. It was created by the British North America Act of 1867. It consisted of the Town of Cornwall and the Township of Cornwall.

The electoral district was abolished in 1882 when it was merged into Cornwall and Stormont riding.

Election results

On Mr. Macdonald being unseated on petition, 7 September 1874:

|}

On Mr. Bergin being unseated on petition, 24 December 1879:

|}

See also 

 List of Canadian federal electoral districts
 Past Canadian electoral districts

External links 
Riding history from the Library of Parliament

Former federal electoral districts of Ontario